This is a list of National Hockey League (NHL) players who have played at least one game in the NHL from 1917 to present and have a last name that starts with "I".

List updated as of the 2018–19 NHL season.

I

 Alex Iafallo
 Al Iafrate
 Mike Iggulden
 Jarome Iginla 
 Viktors Ignatjevs 
 Miroslav Ihnacak
 Peter Ihnacak
 Brent Imlach
 Jarkko Immonen
 Peter Ing
 Earl Ingarfield, Sr.
 Earl Ingarfield, Jr. 
 Bill Inglis
 Jack Ingoldsby
 Connor Ingram
 Frank Ingram 
 Ron Ingram 
 Gary Inness
 Ralph Intranuovo
 Arturs Irbe
 Randy Ireland
 Danny Irmen
 Robbie Irons
 Joe Ironstone
 Dick Irvin
 Ted Irvine
 Leland Irving
 Brayden Irwin
 Ivan Irwin
 Matt Irwin
 Ulf Isaksson
 Brad Isbister
 Kim Issel
 Raitis Ivanans

See also
hockeydb.com NHL Player List - I

Players